Jangi is a national male dance of Azerbaijan.

Etymology
In translation from Azerbaijani language, with the word being derived through Persian, Jangi means “fighting”.

Origination
The dance is very ancient. It's a reminder of the Azerbaijani struggle of strong men and was performed in honour of them. The dance expresses a challenge to a battle.

Performance
The dance is performed only for men, in holidays or concerts.

References

External links
 Cultural Days of Azerbaijan Kick off in Astana
 Days of Azerbaijani Culture in Italy

Azerbaijani dances
War dances